Nathaniel West of Poplar Neck (c. 1665 – 1723) was a planter, military officer and politician of the British Colony and Dominion of Virginia who was one of the first two representatives for King William County in the House of Burgesses, and later represented New Kent County in that legislative assembly.

Early and family life
West was born into the First Families of Virginia, the third son of Colonel John West and his wife Unity Croshaw. He had a sister, like their mother named "Unity," who would marry Henry Fox. His elder brothers John West and Capt. Thomas West would also represent King William County in the House of Burgesses. The family's main plantation house, founded by his grandfather John West, was near the confluence of the Mattiponi and Pamunkey Rivers (which thereby form the York River), and the town now known as West Point, Virginia, but which beginning in 1705 was called "Delaware" to honor his relative Thomas West, 3rd Baron De La Warr.

Career
Nathaniel West farmed using enslaved labor. He also held various local offices, particularly within the militia, receiving promotions from Captain to Lieutenant-Colonel. He became a member of the Virginia House of Burgesses: first as one of the first two representatives from King William County, Virginia (1700–1702), and later for New Kent County (in the 1703–1705 session).

Marriage and issue
On May 14, 1702, Nathaniel married Martha Woodward Macon (1665–1727) in York County, Virginia. Martha was the widow of Gideon Macon, who represented New Kent County several times in the House of Burgesses. They lived at Poplar Neck plantation and had one daughter, Unity, who married, as his second wife, William Dandridge (1689–1743), brother of John Dandridge.

Death and legacy
Nathaniel and Martha West both died in 1723 in New Kent County, Virginia.

Notes

References
 "St. Peter's Parish Records, St. Peter's Parish, New Kent, VA
 "Genealogy of the Harris and Allied Families. Gandrud, Pauline Myra Jones, 1929.
 "The Sneads of Fluvanna.  Hatcher, William E., 1959.
 "Gideon Macon, York and New Kent Co., VA (Sons of the Revolution in the State of Virginia Quarterly Magazine, Volume 4, Number 3, July, 1925)
 "Middle Peninsula Historic Marker "Cockacoeske"
 "The Powhatan Indians of Virginia: Their Traditional Culture. Rountree, Helen C., University of Oklahoma Press, 1989.
 "Cockacoeske, Queen of Pamunkey: Diplomat and Suzeraine." W. Martha W. McCartney.
 "Powhatan's Mantle: Indians in the Colonial Southeast by Peter H. Wood.
 "Tax Rolls, March 1660. 3 March 1659. 1

1665 births
1723 deaths
Virginia colonial people
House of Burgesses members
People from New Kent County, Virginia
Nathaniel West (captain)
People from King William County, Virginia